Antonio Bocchetti (born 28 January 1990) is an Italian former footballer who played as a defender.

Career
Born in Naples, Campania, Bocchetti started his career at Veneto club Padova. Bocchetti received call-up to Italy U16 team during 2005–06 season. On 1 September 2008 Bocchetti left for Lecce in temporary deal. Bocchetti was a member of their reserve team. On 10 July 2009 he was signed by Juve Stabia in co-ownership deal. In June 2010 Padova gave up the remain 50% registration rights to Juve Stabia.

In August 2010 Bocchetti left for Italian fifth division club Casertana.

References

Italian footballers
Calcio Padova players
U.S. Lecce players
S.S. Juve Stabia players
Italy youth international footballers
Association football defenders
Footballers from Naples
1990 births
Living people